Prasanta Raghunath Mohapatra (1 September 1973 – 19 May 2021) was an Indian cricketer. He played in 45 first-class and 17 List A matches for Odisha from 1990–91 to 2002–03. He died from COVID-19.

See also
 List of Odisha cricketers

References

External links
 

1973 births
2021 deaths
Indian cricketers
Odisha cricketers
Sportspeople from Bhubaneswar
Cricketers from Odisha
Deaths from the COVID-19 pandemic in India